The 1983–84 United Counties League season was the 77th in the history of the United Counties League, a football competition in England.

Premier Division

The Premier Division featured 16 clubs which competed in the division last season, along with three new clubs:
Baldock Town, transferred from the South Midlands League
Raunds Town, promoted from Division One
St Neots Town, promoted from Division One

League table

Division One

Division One featured 14 clubs which competed in the division last season, along with two new clubs:
Brackley Town, transferred from the Hellenic League
Kempston Rovers, relegated from the Premier Division

League table

References

External links
 United Counties League

1983–84 in English football leagues
United Counties League seasons